Douglas Hanahan (born 1951) is an American biologist, professor and director emeritus of the Swiss Institute for Experimental Cancer Research at EPFL (École polytechnique Fédérale de Lausanne) in Lausanne, Switzerland. He is currently member of the Lausanne branch of the Ludwig Institute.

He received his PhD from Harvard University in 1983. In 1983, he developed Super Optimal Broth, a microbiological growth medium.  He also improved the protocols used for plasmid transformation of Escherichia coli.
In the 1980s, he developed one of the first transgenic mouse models of cancer.
With Robert Weinberg, he wrote a seminal paper The Hallmarks of Cancer, published in January 2000, and which in March 2011 is the most often cited article from the peer reviewed journal Cell. In 2011, they published an updated review article entitled "Hallmarks of cancer: the next generation". In 2022, Professor Hanahan published another updated review article entitled "Hallmarks of Cancer: New Dimensions" on the peer reviewed journal Cancer Discovery.

Awards 
 2014 Fellow of the AACR Academy
 2014  AACR Lifetime Achievement Award in Cancer Research
 2013  Vice-Director, Swiss Cancer Center Lausanne
 2012  Award for Cancer Research, Fondazione San Salvatore, Lugano
 2010  Elected Member, European Molecular Biology Association
 2009  Elected Member, National Academy of Sciences
 2008  Elected Member, Institute of Medicine
 2007  Elected Fellow, American Academy of Arts and Sciences
 2001–2009  American Cancer Society Research Professor
 1993  Grand Prize for Biology, National Cancer Association of France
 1992–2009  Founding Chair, UCSF Fellows Program
 1984–1988  Group Leader, Cold Spring Harbor Laboratory

Notes and references

See also 
 Swiss Cancer Centre

Living people
Members of the European Molecular Biology Organization
1951 births
Harvard University alumni
University of California, San Francisco faculty
Fellows of the AACR Academy
Members of the National Academy of Medicine